Jérôme Pineau (born 2 January 1980) is a French former professional road bicycle racer, who rode professionally between 2002 and 2015 for the ,  and  squads. Born in Mont-Saint-Aignan, Pineau now works as the general manager for UCI ProSeries team .

Major results

2000
 5th Overall Ruban Granitier Breton
 9th La Côte Picarde
2001
 1st Stage 1 Ronde de l'Isard
 2nd Road race, National Under-23 Road Championships
 4th Liège–Bastogne–Liège U23
 5th La Côte Picarde
2002
 1st Overall Tour de Normandie
 4th Route Adélie
 7th Grand Prix de la Ville de Lillers
 7th Grand Prix de Villers-Cotterêts
 9th Trophée des Grimpeurs
2003
 1st Polynormande
 3rd Overall Tour de l'Ain
1st Stage 1
 3rd Tour de Vendée
 3rd Trophée des Grimpeurs
 5th Overall Étoile de Bessèges
 5th Gran Premio di Lugano
 5th Grand Prix de Plumelec-Morbihan
 7th Grand Prix de Denain
 7th Boucles de l'Aulne
2004
 1st  Overall Tour de l'Ain
1st Stage 1
 1st Paris–Bourges
 1st Clásica de Almería
 3rd Overall International Hessen Rundfahrt
 3rd Trophée des Grimpeurs
 3rd Züri-Metzgete
 3rd Grand Prix de Wallonie
 5th Tour de Vendée
 5th Polynormande
 6th Grand Prix La Marseillaise
 7th GP Miguel Induráin
 8th Overall Étoile de Bessèges
2005
 3rd Route Adélie
 9th Amstel Gold Race
2006
 6th Trophée des Grimpeurs
 7th Cholet-Pays de Loire
2007
 7th Overall Tour du Limousin
 10th Liège–Bastogne–Liège
2008
 2nd Paris–Camembert
 2nd Polynormande
 3rd Grand Prix de Wallonie
 4th Overall Critérium International
 4th Grand Prix de Plumelec-Morbihan
 5th Cholet-Pays de Loire
 5th Châteauroux Classic
 5th Grand Prix de Fourmies
 6th Trophée des Grimpeurs
 7th Overall Volta a la Comunitat Valenciana
 8th Overall Tour du Limousin
 10th Amstel Gold Race
2009
 2nd Brabantse Pijl
 6th Overall Tour du Haut Var
 9th Trofeo Calvià
2010
 Giro d'Italia
1st Stage 5
1st Premio della Fuga
 Tour de France
 Combativity award Stage 7
 King of the Mountains (Stages 2–8 and 10–11)
2011
 1st Grote Prijs Jef Scherens
 9th Brabantse Pijl
 10th Overall La Tropicale Amissa Bongo
2012
 5th Boucles du Sud Ardèche
 7th Overall Four Days of Dunkirk
2014
 5th Gran Premio di Lugano
 9th Overall Tour du Haut Var

Grand Tour general classification results timeline

References

External links

VeloNews.Com: Pineau holds off chase to win Giro stage 5 in dramatic fashion

French male cyclists
1980 births
Living people
Cyclists at the 2008 Summer Olympics
Olympic cyclists of France
People from Mont-Saint-Aignan
French Giro d'Italia stage winners
Sportspeople from Seine-Maritime
Cyclists from Normandy